Scopula promethes is a moth of the  family Geometridae. It is found in Lesotho and South Africa.

References

Moths described in 1928
promethes
Moths of Africa